Cocklebiddy is a small roadhouse community located on the Eyre Highway in Western Australia. It is the third stop after Norseman on the journey east across the Nullarbor Plain. The area is noted for its caves and lakes.

It is the nearest locality to the south coast feature of Twilight Cove, which is 26 km to the south. Cocklebiddy follows the time zone used by Eucla of UTC+8:45. it is situated 284km from Border Village

History
Cocklebiddy started as an Aboriginal mission station, of which only the stone foundations remain today. The area was thought to be a potential water source and, during World War II, Army engineers attempted to tap fresh water from the lakes, but it was found that a thin skin of fresh water overlay a vast volume of saline water.

Unlike most others, it remained in a relatively well-preserved state due to its isolation and protection from the Southern Ocean, and in 1976, when the State Government created the Nuytsland Nature Reserve, the facility was converted into a wildlife observatory, known as Eyre Bird Observatory, which opened in 1978. The observatory offers basic camping facilities. Over 230 species of birds have been spotted there.

Present day

Like other locations in the Nullarbor Plain area, the area consists of little more than a roadhouse. The current business name of the roadhouse is the Wedgetail Inn and like most other Nullarbor establishments has access to satellite television, as well as providing caravan park and hotel motel facilities.

The Cocklebiddy area is noted for its caves, the most notable of which is Cocklebiddy cave – a single passage more than 6 km long, of which around 90% is underwater and only accessible via cave diving. In August 1983, a French team set a world record here for the longest cave dive in the world. In October that year, the French record was beaten by an Australian team when Hugh Morrison of Western Australia pushed another 280 metres beyond where the French had tied off.  In 1995 South Australian cave diver Christopher Brown went another 20 metres further again, and in late 2008 much of the cave's more distant regions were explored, mapped (using radio-location "pingers" designed and operated by Ken Smith) and videotaped by Craig Challen and Richard Harris et al. using rebreather technologies. (Challen and Harris would later be better known for their involvement in the 2018 Tham Luang cave rescue.)

Cocklebiddy was visited in 2007 by the Australian comical duo, Hamish and Andy.

A number of five unique species of Restionaceae (a tussock-like plant) named Harperia, Loxocarya, Onychosepalum, Platychorda and Tremulinawere  exist 15–20 kilometres in a somewhat south westerly direction of Cocklebiddy.

See also

 List of caves in Western Australia
 Cave Divers Association of Australia
 Agnes Milowka
 Leigh Bishop
 The Quiet Achiever
 Nurina Land District

References

Further reading
 (1986) Nullarbor locals swim in the salt lake at the bottom of the cave The West Australian, 5 April 1986, p. 30

External links

Shire of Dundas – Towns of the Eyre Highway
Nullarbor Net – Cocklebiddy including local information.
Eyre Bird Observatory
History of Cocklebiddy Cave Exploration

Towns in Western Australia
Shire of Dundas
Nullarbor Plain
Roadhouses in Western Australia
Underwater diving sites in Australia
Eyre Highway